Eugène Molineau (1883–1949) was a French sculptor. His work was part of the sculpture event in the art competition at the 1928 Summer Olympics.

References

1883 births
1949 deaths
20th-century French sculptors
French male sculptors
Olympic competitors in art competitions
Artists from Tours, France